Tobacco Road Football Club is an American soccer team based in Durham, North Carolina. The team plays in USL League Two, the fourth tier of the American soccer pyramid.

History 
The club existed under various names as a highly successful amateur program for many years in the Triangle Adult Soccer League, including 2013 when the team took the North Carolina Amateur Championship. The club was re-branded as Tobacco Road FC under the leadership of Seth Kaplan and Cedric Burke in 2013. Tobacco Road FC played the 2016 season in the National Premier Soccer League, reaching the finals of the South Atlantic Conference Playoffs where they fell to the Atlanta Silverbacks (NPSL) in extra time. In November 2016 it was announced that Tobacco Road FC would play the 2017 season in the Premier Development League.

Year-by-year

Stadium 
Tobacco Road FC plays its home matches at Durham County Stadium.

References

USL League Two teams
Soccer clubs in North Carolina
Sports in Durham, North Carolina
2013 establishments in North Carolina
Association football clubs established in 2013